Manolo Gómez Bur (21 April 1917 – 30 May 1991) was a Spanish actor of theatre and films. He appeared in over 90 films between 1943 and 1983. He was born in Madrid and he was soon an actor and he died in Andalucía, Spain.

Selected filmography
 Last Day (1952)
 Sister San Sulpicio (1952)
 A Room for Three (1952)
 Congress in Seville (1955)
 Don Juan (1956)
 Quanto sei bella Roma (1959)
 The Two Rivals (1960)
 The Showgirl (1960)
 Police Calling 091 (1960)
 The Mustard Grain (1962)
 You and Me Are Three (1962)
 Queen of The Chantecler (1962)
 The Daughters of Helena (1963)
 The Troublemaker (1963)
 Amor a la española (1967)
 A Decent Adultery (1969)
 The Locket (1970)
 Growing Leg, Diminishing Skirt (1970)
 Una chica casi decente (1971)
 All Is Possible in Granada (1982)

External links

1917 births
1991 deaths
20th-century Spanish male actors
Spanish male film actors